The MS Viking 1 was a car and passenger ferry delivered to Rederi Ab Sally for use in Viking Line traffic between Naantali, Finland and Kapellskär, Sweden. She operated this route in Viking Line colours between 1970 and 1982.

The Viking 1 was later known by the names Wasa Express, Khalid 1, Mecca 1, Al Hussein II, Al-Quamar Al-Saudi Al-Misri 1, Mecca 1, Al-Quamar Al-Saudi II and Fagr. As the Fagr, the ship capsized in a storm in the Red Sea on 19 April 2000. The wreck was salvaged and scrapped in October 2002.

References

Ferries of Finland
Ships built in Papenburg
1970 ships